Jabez Jenkins McClelland is an American physicist.

McClelland studied music and physics at Wesleyan University, and pursued graduate study in physics at the University of Texas at Austin. He was a postdoctoral researcher at the National Institute of Standards and Technology, and remained there full-time, successively heading the Electron Physics Group and Alternative Computing Group. McClelland was elected a fellow of the American Physical Society in 1998 "[f]or elucidation of spin polarized electron-atom interactions, and for pioneering development and application of atom optical methods in nanostructure fabrication." An equivalent honor bestowed by the Optical Society of America in 2004 acknowledged McClelland for his "contributions to atom optics, including the fabrication of stable structures by direct-write atomic lithography."

References

Living people
Year of birth missing (living people)
National Institute of Standards and Technology people
University of Texas at Austin alumni
Fellows of the American Physical Society
Wesleyan University alumni
21st-century American physicists
20th-century American physicists
Fellows of Optica (society)